"Silent Love (Open My Heart)/Be With U" is Mai Kuraki's twenty-seventh single, released on November 28, 2007. It is Kuraki's first double A-side single in 6 years as well as her first single to be released in both limited and regular editions. The single was originally scheduled to drop on November 21 but was postponed by a week (a first for Kuraki) due to circumstances unrelated to production. The initial cover was also replaced a month before its release.

Usage in media
 NC Japan gamesoft "Lineage II First Throne Arata na Shuzoku Kamael" image song (#1)

Track listing

Charts

Oricon Sales Chart

External links
Kuraki Mai Official Website

2007 singles
2007 songs
Mai Kuraki songs
Songs written by Mai Kuraki
Songs with music by Akihito Tokunaga
Song recordings produced by Daiko Nagato